The Ice Hockey World Championship is an annual ice hockey tournament organized by the International Ice Hockey Federation (IIHF). The IIHF has given directorate awards for play during each year's championship tournament to the top goaltender, defenceman and forward (all since 1954), and most valuable player chosen by media (since 1999).

Directorate awards

See also
List of IIHF World Championship medalists
IIHF Centennial All-Star Team

References

External links

International Ice Hockey Federation official website

Award winners
IIHF World Championship directorate